The 1975 PBA season was the inaugural season of the Philippine Basketball Association.

Notable events
In 1975, nine big corporations with basketball teams in the Manila Industrial Commercial Athletic Association (MICAA) declared their independence from the Basketball Association of the Philippines and formed the first professional basketball league in Asia, the Philippine Basketball Association (PBA).

On April 9, the PBA opens with its inaugural double-header at the Araneta Coliseum, with a sellout crowd of 18,000 watching, the Marisawa-Noritake Porcelain Makers defeated Concepcion Carrier, 101–98, in the opening game while Toyota Comets won over U/Tex Weavers, 105–101, in the main game. Gregorio "Joy" Dionisio of Carrier scored the very first basket in PBA history. 

In front of 11,000 fans at the Rizal Memorial Coliseum on May 10, the Crispa-Floro Redmanizers and Toyota Comets clash for the first time in what could be the start of their long-storied rivalry. The Redmanizers hacked out a 139–133 victory to hand the Comets their first loss of the season and halted their seven-game winning streak. Bogs Adornado topscored for Crispa with 29 points.

All-Star games
In pioneering version of All-star games on December 23, the Brown team coach by Baby Dalupan beats Dante Silverio's Yellow squad, 126–123, in the third and deciding match of the PBA Ovaltine dream games. Members of the Brown team were Ramon Fernandez, William Adornado, Rudolf Kutch, Rudy Soriano, Atoy Co, Francis Arnaiz, Larry Mumar, Dave Regullano, Freddie Hubalde, Reynaldo Alcantara, Estoy Estrada, Rey Franco, Cristino Reynoso, Jimmy Noblezada and Romy Cabading, the Yellow team were composed of Robert Jaworski, Rosalio Martirez, Bernie Fabiosa, Johnny Revilla, Lim Eng Beng, Gregorio Dionisio, Danny Florencio, Jimmy Mariano, Adriano Papa, Manny Paner, Abet Guidaben, Rudolfo Segura, Ricardo Cleofas, Ramon Lucindo and Romeo Frank, who replaced the suspended Philip Cezar.

Champions
 First Conference: Toyota Comets
 Second Conference: Toyota Comets
 All-Philippine Championship: Crispa Redmanizers
 Team with best win–loss percentage: Toyota Comets (42–15, .737)
 Best Team of the Year: Toyota Comets (1st)

Individual awards
 Most Valuable Player: Bogs Adornado (Crispa)
 Mythical Five:
Francis Arnaiz (Toyota)
Atoy Co (Crispa)
Manny Paner (Royal)
Ernesto Estrada (Royal)
Bogs Adornado (Crispa)

Cumulative standings

Board of governors
 Leopoldo Prieto – Commissioner
 Emerson Coseteng – President (Mariwasa Group)
 Walter Euyang (Universal Textile Mills, Inc.)
 Domingo Itchon (Elizalde and Co., Inc.)
 Leonardo "Skip" Guinto (San Miguel Corporation)
 Jose "Dondo" Lim III (Concepcion Industries, Inc.)
 Enrico Villaflor (Seven-Up Bottling Company of the Philippines)
 Porfirio Zablan (CFC Corporation)
 Pablo Carlos (Delta Motor Corporation)
 Valeriano "Danny" Floro (P. Floro and Sons)

Notes
The first and second conference of the season were officially named as All-Filipino Conference and Open Conference respectively. The first All-Filipino Conference was reclassified as an import-laced tournament since the league gave teams the option to hire foreign players or "imports". Both tournaments were renamed as First and Second Conference based on the records under the "Winners circle over the years" section of the official PBA Annual, Hardcourt, since its 2001 edition.

References

 
PBA